Senecio fistulosus is a species of the genus Senecio, family Asteraceae and one of the many species of Senecio native to Chile.

References

External links

fistulosus
Flora of Chile
Taxa named by Eduard Friedrich Poeppig